Curtis Sliwa (born March 26, 1954) is an American activist, radio talk show host and founder and chief executive officer of the Guardian Angels, a nonprofit organization for unarmed crime prevention.  Sliwa was  the Republican nominee for the 2021 New York City mayoral election, which he lost to Brooklyn Borough President Eric Adams.

Early life
Curtis Sliwa was born on March 26, 1954, into a Catholic family of Polish and Italian descent, in Canarsie, Brooklyn. He has two sisters. He attended Brooklyn Prep, a Jesuit high school from which he was later expelled, and graduated from Canarsie High School. In his youth, he worked as a delivery boy for the Daily News, where he was awarded the title of "Newsboy of the Year" and a trip to the White House after he saved several people from a burning building while on a paper route.

Prior to founding the Guardian Angels, he was night manager of a McDonald's restaurant on Fordham Road in the Bronx.

Guardian Angels

In May 1977, Sliwa created the "Magnificent 13", a civilian group dedicated to combating violence and crime on the New York City Subway. At the time, the city was experiencing a crime wave. The Magnificent 13 grew and was renamed the Guardian Angels in 1979. The group's actions drew strong reactions, both positive and negative. Membership of the Guardian Angels showed 80 percent of them were either black or Hispanic in ethnic origin. Unarmed, the group required training in karate and fulfillment of legal requirements for citizens' arrest for all members before they were to be deployed. Sliwa's red beret is a component of the Guardian Angels' uniform.

Mayor Ed Koch, a critic of Sliwa and of the organization, launched an investigation into the Guardian Angels, which according to The Washington Post, proved "so positive that the Guardian Angels will soon be awarded some sort of official status." Then-Lieutenant Governor Mario Cuomo was a rare early advocate of the organization, being quoted saying "[t]hey are a better expression of morality than our city deserves".

In 1992, Sliwa admitted that he and The Guardian Angels faked heroic subway rescues for publicity. He also admitted to having claimed falsely that three off-duty transit police officers had kidnapped him.

In the early 1980s, he expanded operations to Buffalo, and was often critical of local police policies and practices. One incident involved Guardian Angels member Frank Melvin, who was fatally shot by a Newark police officer in December 1981 after an officer claimed they mistook his unzipping of his jacket – to display his Guardian Angels emblem – as a threat. Sliwa claimed that the killing of Melvin – an African American – was racially motivated, and had been done by a white officer who was being protected by the police department, rather than by the Hispanic officer identified as the shooter. An Essex County grand jury cleared both officers of charges related to Melvin's death.

Murder attempt
On June 19, 1992, Sliwa was kidnapped and shot by two gunmen after entering a stolen taxi in Manhattan. The taxi picked up Sliwa near his home in the East Village, and a gunman hiding in the front passenger seat jumped up and fired several shots, hitting him in the groin and legs. The kidnapping was foiled when Sliwa leapt from a front window of the moving cab and escaped. Sliwa underwent surgery for internal injuries and leg wounds.

Federal prosecutors eventually charged John A. Gotti, the son of Gambino crime family leader John Gotti, with the attempted murder and a raft of other charges. Prosecutors claimed that Gotti was angered by remarks Sliwa had made on his radio program about Gotti's father. However, after three attempts to try him, the last on September 20, 2005, three separate juries were unable to agree to convict Gotti on any of the charges brought against him, and the charges were dropped. Jurors later told reporters they did believe he had a role in Sliwa's shooting. Prosecutors declined to re-try Gotti and dismissed the charges against him. Sliwa said he would seek damages in civil court.

Michael Yannotti, a Gotti associate, was also charged with shooting Sliwa in the incident but was acquitted. Yannotti, however, was sentenced to 20 years on an unrelated racketeering charge. Still, Manhattan Federal Judge Shira Scheindlin said evidence suggested Yannotti was the shooter.

Media career

Radio

Sliwa has been a radio broadcaster for three decades, most of that time on WABC-AM, where he began his career in 1990. In 1994, the then city-owned and operated WNYC hired Sliwa, who had been released by WABC. Some, including Sliwa, have suggested that he was given access to the station by newly-elected Mayor Rudy Giuliani, whom he had supported in the 1993 mayoral race.

Sliwa has become a conservative radio talk show host.  Since 1996, he has hosted various radio programs on WABC, and in 2000, he became the co-host, with attorney Ron Kuby, of the long-running Curtis and Kuby in the Morning. The show lasted eight years before Citadel Broadcasting replaced the team with Don Imus. His longtime broadcast partner was lawyer Ron Kuby, with whom he had multiple times hosted in the past "Curtis & Kuby" weekday radio show at noon, on WABC-AM in New York City. Starting in June 2017, Sliwa's co-host was attorney and television commentator, Eboni Williams. His most recent co-host was Juliet Huddy, who joined the show in February 2019.

The Curtis Sliwa LIVE program began national syndication on December 1, 2008. WABC retained Sliwa until November 2009, when his show was cancelled after a contract dispute. He hosted both the morning and evening "drive time" shows on WNYM-AM 970, but as of January 2, 2014, Sliwa returned to WABC, replacing Rush Limbaugh who moved to WOR-AM. Prior to his mayoral campaign, a Bronx lawyer lodged a complaint against Sliwa, alleging he was promoting his mayoral candidacy on his show, which would violate campaign laws. Sliwa said he was considering quitting his show, but would only make a decision after he garnered enough signatures to appear on the ballot for the Republican primaries. After officially declaring his candidacy in March 2021, Sliwa's radio program went on hiatus. From roughly 2005 to 2013, Sliwa's show(s) were produced by Frank Morano, who was a frequent on-air foil.

Politics
In September 2016, Sliwa and Frank Morano launched a successful hostile takeover of the Reform Party of New York State. The party lost its ballot access in the November 2018 elections.

In December 2019, Sliwa declared in an interview that he hated then-President of the United States Donald Trump, calling him a "screwball and a crackpot". In February 2021, weeks after Trump left office, Sliwa switched from the Reform Party to the Republican Party. Sliwa  changed parties and lost control over the Reform Party after losing the required votes to keep the Reform Party on the ballot. Bill C. Merrell regained control over the NYS Reform Party and is now again NYS Chair of the Reform Party. The official state Party is again affiliated with the National Reform Party.

2021 mayoral campaign

Sliwa announced on March 8, 2020, that he would be running for mayor of New York City in 2021 as a Republican, seeking to become the 110th mayor of New York City. 

Once friends, the primary race turned Sliwa and Fernando Mateo into bitter rivals. The Manhattan, Queens and Bronx Republican parties endorsed Mateo, while the Staten Island and Brooklyn Republican parties endorsed Sliwa. Sliwa criticized Mateo for donating to the 2017 re-election campaign of Mayor Bill de Blasio, a Democrat, and Sliwa also accused Mateo of breaking the law; Mateo replied that Sliwa's accusations were bogus and shameful.

During the campaign, Mateo and Sliwa clashed over loyalty to former president Donald Trump. Mateo believes the claims that Trump won the 2020 presidential election; by contrast, Sliwa did not support Trump in either 2016 or 2020, and does not support Trump's claims of election fraud. The unofficial results showed Sliwa winning by 72 to 28 percent.

Sliwa has run on a platform opposing the defund the police movement, supporting a property tax overhaul so that working-class residents would not pay higher property taxes than wealthy citizens, keeping in place the Specialized High Schools Admissions Test while increasing opportunities for vocational training in charter schools, and focusing on fiscal restraint. He also opposes the killing of unwanted animals and supports making all animal shelters no-kill shelters.

Sliwa campaigned on beginning a trial program, if elected, to test out the feasibility of universal basic income in New York City.

Sliwa lost to Brooklyn Borough President Eric Adams in a landslide defeat in the general election on November 2, 2021. Sliwa conceded that same night, calling for unity in order to "save" New York City.

Personal life

Sliwa is a Roman Catholic.

Sliwa has been married four times. He wed his second wife, Lisa Evers, in 1981. At the time, she was National Director of the Guardian Angels and co-hosted a WABC-AM radio show called Angels in the Morning. She is also a martial arts expert who briefly trained with the World Wrestling Federation in 1986. 

In 2000, Sliwa married his third wife, Mary Galda, a former WABC employee who also served as The Guardian Angels' national director. They have one son, Anthony Chester.

Sliwa was diagnosed with prostate cancer in 2010, which he announced publicly on April 20, 2011.

Sliwa was in a relationship with Melinda Katz, the Queens County District Attorney, and separated from her in 2014; they have two children together, conceived in vitro over the previous five years. She is named in a court case involving Sliwa, accused by his ex-wife Mary of diverting money to Katz while still married to Mary, as part of a plan to build a "nest egg" with Katz prior to moving in with her.

In 2018 Sliwa wed longtime girlfriend, animal activist & attorney Nancy Regula at the Howe Caverns.  They live on the Upper West Side with their many rescue cats.

References

Further reading
 Paterson, David (2020). Black, Blind, & in Charge: A Story of Visionary Leadership and Overcoming Adversity. New York: Skyhorse Publishing.

External links

 
 
 
 
 
 

1954 births
Living people
People from Canarsie, Brooklyn
People from the East Village, Manhattan
American activists
American people of Italian descent
American politicians of Polish descent
American shooting survivors
American talk radio hosts
Anti-crime activists
Brooklyn Preparatory School alumni
Canarsie High School alumni
Candidates in the 2021 United States elections
Catholics from New York (state)
Community organizing
Kidnapped American people
New York (state) Republicans
Right-wing populism in the United States
21st-century American politicians